Llegar a Ti ("Get to You") is the first Spanish release by contemporary Christian music singer Jaci Velásquez. The album peaked at No. 4 on the Top Latin Albums chart while the title track reached No. 1 on both the Billboard Hot Latin Tracks and Latin Pop Songs charts. It received a nomination for a Grammy Award for Best Latin Pop Album, and the album's lead single, "Llegar a Ti", was nominated at the first Latin Grammy Awards in the category of "Best Female Pop Vocal Performance".

Track listing
 "Con tu amor" (With Your love)
 "Llegar a ti" (To get to you) (later adapted in English as "Love Will Find You")
 "Un lugar celestial" (A heavenly place) (Spanish version of: "Un Lugar Celestial")
 "Sólo tú" (Only You)
 "Manantial de caricias" (Caresses' fountain)
 "De creer en tí" (Trust in You) (Spanish version of: "On My Knees")
 "Junto a mí" (By my side)
 "Mira lo que has hecho en mí" (Look what You have done in me) (Spanish version of: "Look What Love Has Done")
 "Dentro está tu voz" (Your voice is inside me) (Spanish version of: "Little Voice Inside")
 "Como una flor" (Like a flower) (Spanish version of: "Flower in the Rain")
 "Al mundo, Dios amó" (God loved the world) (Spanish version of: "God So Loved")

Singles
 "Llegar a ti" (A videoclip was made for this song)
 "De creer en ti" (A videoclip was made for this song)
 "Sólo tú"
 "Un lugar celestial" (A videoclip was made for this song)

Charts

Sales and certifications

References

External links
Listing on official site

1999 albums
Jaci Velasquez albums
Albums produced by Rudy Pérez
Spanish-language albums